is a professional Go player.

Biography
Susumu became a professional in 1965. He was promoted to 9 dan in 1994. Susumu became a student of Kaoru Iwamoto in 1959. Reached 500 career wins in 1990. Older brother of Masaaki Fukui 8 dan.

Promotion record

References

External links
 Nihon Ki-in profile 

1947 births
Japanese Go players
Living people
People from Tokyo